Hans Jørgen Thorvald Christensen (1924–1983) was a Danish-born American master silversmith, metalsmith, jeweler, designer, and educator. In the second half of the 20th century, he was a major contributor to handcrafted silver design in the United States.

Christensen taught at Rochester Institute of Technology for many years and held the Charlotte Fredericks Mowris Professorship in Contemporary Crafts. In 1979, he was honored as a Fellow of the American Craft Council. He is the namesake of the Society of American Silversmiths' Hans Christensen Sterling Silversmith's Award.

Early life and education 
Hans Jørgen Thorvald Christensen was born on January 21, 1924, in Copenhagen, Denmark, to parents Valborg (née Makkenbol) and Holger Christensen. 

He attended the Tegne- og Kunstindustriskolen (English: Arts and Crafts School; now known as Danmarks Designskole) in Copenhagen and the National School for Arts and Crafts (Norwegian: Statens håndverks- og kunstindustriskole; now known as Norwegian National Academy of Craft and Art Industry) in Oslo.

Career 
Christensen worked at Georg Jensen Sølvsmedie (English: Georg Jensen Silversmithy), that started early in his career in 1939 and lasted for 10 years. In 1944, he completed his basic apprenticeship with a journeyman’s project. Christensen created a notable silver tea pot, which received two silver medallion awards from King Frederick IX of Denmark. 

In 1954, Christensen immigrated to the United States to teach metalsmithing and jewelry at Rochester Institute of Technology (RIT) in Rochester, New York. John Prip had recommended Christensen for the job role. Christensen worked at RIT until his death in 1983. He had many notable students, including silversmith William Nicholas Frederick (1921–2012). 

He died in a car accident on January 16, 1983, in Henrietta, New York. Christensen's work can be found in various collections including the Vatican Museums papal art collection, and in multiple collections for European royal families.

Personal life 
From 1953 to 1965, Christensen was married to Astrid Elizabeth "Betten" Sandum. From 1968 until 1983, the time of his death, Christensen was married to Elizabeth "Els" Meijer.

References

External links 

 Hans Christensen papers, 1924-1989, bulk 1955-1983, Archives of American Art, Smithsonian Institution

1924 births
1983 deaths
Road incident deaths in New York (state)
Danish emigrants to the United States
American metalsmiths
American silversmiths
Danish silversmiths
Rochester Institute of Technology faculty
Danmarks Designskole
Artists from Rochester, New York
Artists from Copenhagen